Onekama Township is a civil township of Manistee County in the U.S. state of Michigan. The population was 1,514 at the 2000 census.

Communities 
 The Village of Onekama is located within the township on the northeast side of Portage Lake. The Onekama ZIP code 49675 serves southern and central portions of the township.
 The City of Manistee is to the southwest and the Manistee ZIP code 49660 serves a small area of the township on the south west side of Portage Lake.
 The Village of Bear Lake is to the west in Bear Lake Township and the Bear Lake ZIP code 49614 serves most of the northern part and a small area in the eastern part of Onekama Township.
In 1866, the Turnersport Pier Company built a pier here on Lake Michigan to ship wood. The place was at first known as Turnersport and was given a post office with that name in August 1868. Charles W. Perry from Vermont first came here in 1868. He bought the property in 1871 and developed the settlement. The settlement was renamed Pierport and the post office was renamed in June 1872. It was also known as Perry's Pier. The post office operated seasonally during the summer from 1929 until closing in December 1933.
 Portage Point is an unincorporated summer resort in the southwest part of the township.
 Red Park is an unincorporated community in the township on the south shore of Portage Lake.
 Wick-A-Te-Wah is an unincorporated summer resort in the township on the south shore of Portage Lake.
 Williamsport was a historical settlement in the southwest part of the township.
 Crescent Beach is located on the southwestern shore of Portage Lake and stretches from Red Park to Williamsport.

Summer camps

In addition to the summer communities, there are also a number of well-known summer camps developed, associated with schools or church denominations. These include:

 Camp Tosebo on the south side of Portage Lake
 Little Eden on the north side of Portage Lake
 Portage Lake Covenant Bible Camp on the southeastern side of Portage Lake. PLCBC was founded in 1946. www.portagelake.org

Geography

Demographics
As of the census of 2000, there were 1,514 people, 603 households, and 414 families residing in the township. The racial makeup of the township was 92.80% White, 0.07% African American, 0.46% Native American, 0.07% Asian, 5.68% from other races, and 0.92% from two or more races. Hispanic or Latino of any race were 9.91% of the population.

There were 603 households, out of which 23.4% had children under the age of 18 living with them, 57.5% were married couples living together, 8.0% had a female householder with no husband present, and 31.3% were non-families. 28.4% of all households were made up of individuals, and 15.6% had someone living alone who was 65 years of age or older.  The average household size was 2.22 and the average family size was 2.69.

In the township the population was spread out, with 21.7% under the age of 18, 6.0% from 18 to 24, 21.9% from 25 to 44, 26.3% from 45 to 64, and 24.2% who were 65 years of age or older.  The median age was 45 years. For every 100 females, there were 101.6 males.  For every 100 females age 18 and over, there were 97.3 males.

The median income for a household in the township was $39,792, and the median income for a family was $51,042. Males had a median income of $35,375 versus $19,625 for females. The per capita income for the township was $20,919.  About 6.0% of families and 9.6% of the population were below the poverty line, including 15.3% of those under age 18 and 2.1% of those age 65 or over.

References 

Townships in Manistee County, Michigan
Townships in Michigan